Fred Craig may refer to:

 F. W. S. Craig (1929–1989), Scottish psephologist
 Fred Craig, designer of the .22 TCM pistol cartridge
 Fred Craig (footballer) (born 1893), Scottish football goalkeeper